Garland House or Garland Farm may refer to:

in the United States 
(by state then city)
Augustus Garland House, Little Rock, Arkansas, listed on the National Register of Historic Places (NRHP)
Garland House (Dubuque, Iowa), listed on the NRHP in Dubuque County
Garland House (Bernice, Louisiana), listed on the NRHP in Union Parish
Garland Farm, Bar Harbor, Maine, listed on the NRHP in Hancock County
Garland-Buford House, Leasburg, North Carolina, listed on the NRHP in Caswell County
Hamlin Garland House, West Salem, Wisconsin, listed on the NRHP in La Crosse County